{{DISPLAYTITLE:C10H16O2}} 
The molecular formula C10H16O2 may refer to:

 Ascaridole
 Chrysanthemic acid
 trans-4,5-Epoxy-(E)-2-decenal
 Geranic acid
 Iridodial
 Iridomyrmecin
 Jasmine lactone
 Lineatin
 Massoia lactone
 Nepetalactol
 Nerolic acid